Doug Graham is a Canadian politician, who was elected to in the Yukon Legislative Assembly in the 2011 election. He represented the electoral district of Porter Creek North as a member of the Yukon Party caucus until his defeat in the 2016 election.

He previously represented the district of Whitehorse Porter Creek West from 1978 to 1982.

Before becoming a territorial legislator a second time, Graham was elected in 2009 as a city councillor in Whitehorse, carrying the highest number of votes amongst all candidates. In 2021, he ran for the Whitehorse City Council a second time, narrowly missing being elected by 22 votes.

Electoral record

Yukon general election, 2016

|-

| NDP
| Liz Hanson
| align="right"| 487
| align="right"| 43.8%
| align="right"| -18.3%

| Liberal
| Tamara Goeppel
| align="right"| 432
| align="right"| 38.9%
| align="right"| +23.6%
|-

|-
! align=left colspan=3|Total
! align=right| 1,112
! align=right| 100.0%
! align=right| –
|}

Yukon general election, 2011

|-

|-
! align=left colspan=3|Total
! align=right| 804
! align=right| 100.0%
! align=right| –

Whitehorse municipal election, 2009

Yukon general election, 1978

|-

| Progressive Conservative
| Doug Graham
| align="right"| 188
| align="right"| 48.2%
| align="right"| –

| Liberal
| Clive Tanner
| align="right"| 142
| align="right"| 36.4%
| align="right"| –

| NDP
| Kathy Horton
| align="right"| 60
| align="right"| 15.4%
| align="right"| –
|-
! align=left colspan=3|Total
! align=right| 390
! align=right| 100.0%
! align=right| –
|}

References

Yukon Party MLAs
Living people
Politicians from Whitehorse
21st-century Canadian politicians
1949 births